Derek Leslie Williams is a British resident composer, orchestrator, conductor and record producer. 33 recording credits, and  27 films, documentary and television series credits. Civil rights activist, also known for his 'Save Sibelius' campaign in the United Kingdom (2012-2013). Since 2007, has served as lecturer/tutor in Composition and Orchestration on the Associated Staff of The University of Edinburgh Music Department. Chair of Wagner Society of Scotland, a member of the International Association of Wagner Societies.

Williams first came to public notice in 1974, when he founded the New Zealand School of Music through which he established the first non-university tertiary level qualification for conductors of music in the Southern Hemisphere. As arranger, orchestrator, conductor and musician commissioned by international artists Caroline O'Connor, Sir Robert Helpmann, Torvill and Dean, Grace Knight, Frank Bennett, Debbie Newsome, Sir Howard Morrison, and prominent Australian screen composers Martin Armiger, Guy Gross, and Antony Partos, Williams is also known for his reorchestrations of tracks from hit records. His commissions have been performed in the Royal Albert Hall, Garrick Theatre and Kings Place (London), at the Sydney Opera House and Hamer Hall, Melbourne, Australia, and at the Montreux Jazz Festival. As a chorister, he performed in the 640 voice Third International Choral Festival at the Lincoln Center for the Performing Arts under Robert Shaw with Peter Godfrey's Auckland University Festival Choir, as well as at The White House, the John F. Kennedy Center for the Performing Arts, the United Nations and at Westminster Abbey and King's College Chapel, Cambridge.

Williams was the orchestrator and conductor of the Victorian Philharmonic Orchestra for Guy Gross's score for Stephan Elliott's Frauds, starring Phil Collins and Hugo Weaving, and his Oscar winning film The Adventures of Priscilla Queen of the Desert, and for Martin Armiger's score for The Crossing, starring Russell Crowe.  He was orchestrator for Antony Partos' score for Crush, winner of Best Film Score at New Zealand Film and TV Awards, and was arranger and conductor for the Australian Broadcasting Corporation multi-platinum album Vince Jones & Grace Knight – Come In Spinner from the ABC miniseries Come In Spinner for record producer Martin Armiger. His most recent film score was for Ruaridh M Turner's The Beast in the Storm, which won Order of Merit in the Indie Fest and Best Action/Thriller/SciFi - Los Angeles Independent Film Festival Awards.

Credits

Filmography

Commissioning composers:
Martin Armiger, Guy Gross, Antony Partos, Roy Hubermann, David Kimber

Commissioning organisations:
Royal Hospital for Sick Children, Edinburgh, Australian Broadcasting Corporation, Nine Network, EMI Music Australia, Festival Mushroom Records, Picture This Music, John Singleton Ltd

Derek Williams credited as Arranger, Orchestrator, Composer, Associate Composer, Conductor or Musician in the following moving image works:

Film

 The Beast in the Storm, Turner Gang, (2016) composer, orchestrator, musician, audio engineer
 Plot for Peace, (2013) orchestrator – Empire
 Hildegarde, Screen Australia, (2001) orchestrator
 Empire, Australian Broadcasting Corporation, (1997) orchestrator
 The Adventures of Priscilla Queen of the Desert, PolyGram Filmed Entertainment, (1994) orchestrator
 Frauds, J & M Entertainment, (1993) orchestrator, conductor, composer – additional music
 Crush, Australian Film Council, (1992) orchestrator
  Blinky Bill, Yoram Gross Productions, (1992) orchestrator, conductor
 The Rainbow Warrior Conspiracy, Seven Network, (1989) arranger, orchestrator
 The Crossing, Beyond International Group, (1990) orchestrator, conductor, composer – additional music
 Ring of Scorpio, Nine Network Australia, (1989) orchestrator, conductor, composer – additional music

Television

 Glenfiddich 21yo – TV & Online Media Campaign (2015) composer additional music, arranger/orchestrator, conductor, mixing and mastering engineer
 Hard Knox, Peter Bloomfield, (2001) orchestrator, composer – additional music
 Thank God He Met Lizzie, Stamen Films Ltd, (1997) orchestrator
  Seven Deadly Sins, Australian Broadcasting Corporation, (1993) arranger, musician
 The Other Side of Paradise, Network Ten, (1992) orchestrator, conductor, composer – additional music
 Children of the Dragon, Australian Broadcasting Corporation, based on Tiananmen Square protests of 1989, (1991) orchestrator, conductor
 Police Rescue, Australian Broadcasting Corporation, (1992) composer – additional music, arranger, keyboard programming
 Come In Spinner, Australian Broadcasting Corporation, (1990) arranger, orchestrator, conductor
  Body Surfer, Ian Barry (1989) orchestrator, conductor, musician
 The Last Resort, Australian Broadcasting Corporation, (1988) orchestrator, conductor, composer – additional music
 Seven Network TV Sports ID's, and Station ID Let's Celebrate '88 (1988)

Documentary

 Mail Porter, Royal Hospital for Sick Children, Edinburgh, (2015) composer, orchestrator, musician, audio engineer
 The Making of Longbird, Edinburgh College of Art (2012) musician
 Black Swan, Antony Partos (1995) orchestrator
 Widows, Roy Hubermann – Australian movie (1994) arranger, orchestrator
 The Wonderful World of Dogs, Mark Lewis (filmmaker), (1990) composer – additional music
  In Grave Danger of Falling Food, 220 Productions – Bill Mollison (1989) composer, arranger, orchestrator, musician
 Flashbacks, Australian Broadcasting Corporation (1988) audio engineer

Discography

References

British composers
20th-century classical composers
21st-century classical composers
Film score composers
People associated with the University of Edinburgh
University of Auckland alumni
Alumni of the University of Edinburgh
British musical theatre composers
New Zealand classical composers
New Zealand conductors (music)
Male opera composers
Music arrangers